Sharlene Mawdsley (born 10 August 1998) is an Irish athlete. She competed in the women's 400 metres event at the 2021 European Athletics Indoor Championships.

References

External links
 

1998 births
Living people
Irish female sprinters
Place of birth missing (living people)